Mount Liavaag is a mountain,  high, between Mount Holmboe and the Holth Peaks near the northern end of the Sentinel Range in the Ellsworth Mountains of Antarctica. It was discovered by Lincoln Ellsworth on his trans-Antarctic flight of November 23, 1935, and was named by the Advisory Committee on Antarctic Names for First Mate Liavaag of the Wyatt Earp in 1935–36, and also a member of Ellsworth's two earlier Antarctic expeditions.

See also
 Mountains in Antarctica

References

Ellsworth Mountains
Mountains of Ellsworth Land